Telesphore Dusabe (born 15 May 1965) is a Rwandan long-distance runner. He competed in the men's marathon at the 1988 Summer Olympics.

References

1965 births
Living people
Athletes (track and field) at the 1988 Summer Olympics
Rwandan male long-distance runners
Rwandan male marathon runners
Olympic athletes of Rwanda
Place of birth missing (living people)